Timothy Paul Andrew Standing (born 6 August 1964 in Hyde, Cheshire) is a former English cricketer. He was a right-handed batsman and wicket-keeper who played for Cheshire.

Standing, who debuted for Cheshire in the 1992 Holt Cup, and who played in the Minor Counties Championship between 1992 and 1993, made two List A appearances for the team, in the NatWest Trophy. From the lower order, he scored a duck in his first match, and two runs in his second.

External links
Timothy Standing at Cricket Archive 

1964 births
Living people
English cricketers
Cheshire cricketers
People from Hyde, Greater Manchester